Wicked Wonderland is the seventh studio album by American rock-musician Lita Ford and her first of new material in almost 15 years.

Ford said about the album: "Everybody has their own 'Wicked Wonderland'.  It's a place where you can do whatever you want and get as freaky as you feel. These songs are my version of that - they're all about my life…well, the parts that happen when the kids are in bed and my husband and I get into the boudoir."(...)"This is definitely the heaviest stuff I’ve ever recorded.  I've evolved and matured as a person and so has my music. It’s lyrically very real." In her 2016 memoir, Ford disowned the album.

In October, 2009 the album also was released as limited edition vinyl LP, with modified track listing (without two last songs as well as with different track order) and different artwork.

In popular culture
The track "Betrayal" is one of the 108 songs that appear in the Xbox 360 and PlayStation 3 video game, Brütal Legend, to which Lita also contributed her likeness and voice to the character "Rima, Queen of the Zaulia". The track is featured as background music for one of the cutscenes in the game's story mode, and can be played on the in-game radio once unlocked.

Track listing

Personnel 
Lita Ford - vocals, guitars, producer
Jim Gillette - vocals, producer, engineer, mixing
Greg Hampton - guitars, bass, keyboards, producer, mixing
Stet Howland, Chris Collier - drums
Jeremy Mackenzie - engineer, mixing
Maor Appelbaum - mastering
Piggy D. - art direction, design, photography
Tyler Clinton - photography
Hazmat Design- art direction, design, typography, styling

References

Lita Ford albums
2009 albums
Edel AG albums